Fath Al-Andalus is a Kuwaiti-Syrian television series filmed in 2022. In April 2022, the series sparked anger in Morocco as the producer being accused of erasing the Amazigh identity of Tariq Ibn Ziyad, the main protagonist in the series.

References

Television series about Islam
2022 television series debuts
2022 television series endings
Arabic-language television shows